Chinato is a dialect of Extremaduran spoken in Malpartida de Plasencia. This dialect is nearly extinct.

References 

Extremaduran language

Endangered Romance languages